British Lions v The Rest was a 1986 rugby union match that saw the British Lions play against 'The Rest' to celebrate the centenary of the International Rugby Football Board. The Rest consisted of players from Australia, France, New Zealand and South Africa. At the time, there were only eight unions affiliated to the Board, thus only players from those countries were chosen. The Rest beat the Lions 15–7 in April 1986 in the match played at Cardiff Arms Park.

British Lions selection
The Lions team was selected by the Four Home Unions committee which organises Lions tours. The Lions would have toured South Africa in 1986 if the regular schedule had been followed, but in December 1985 the South African Rugby Board announced they would not be inviting the Lions side to tour South Africa the following year. Political objections to South Africa's apartheid policies including a potential boycott of the 1986 Commonwealth Games and state of emergency in South Africa at the time lay behind this decision. The Lions squad was managed by Clive Rowlands and coached by Mick Doyle. The 21 players selected were issued with Lions' blazers and ties and considered to be official British Lions.

The match
The match was a midweek game in Cardiff. The wet weather marred the game, in marked contrast to the Overseas Unions match three days later played in ideal conditions at Twickenham.

British Lions: Gavin Hastings; Trevor Ringland, Brendan Mullin, John Devereux, Rory Underwood; John Rutherford, Robert Jones; Jeff Whitefoot, Colin Deans (captain), Des Fitzgerald, Wade Dooley, Donal Lenihan, John Jeffrey, John Beattie, Nigel Carr Replacements Iain Paxton for Dooley; Malcolm Dacey for Rutherford

The Rest: Serge Blanco; Patrick Estève, Andrew Slack (captain), Michael Lynagh, John Kirwan (rugby); Wayne Smith, Nick Farr-Jones; Enrique Rodriguez, Tom Lawton, Gary Knight, Steve Cutler, Schalk Burger, Mark Shaw, Murray Mexted, Simon Poidevin

See also
 Five Nations XV v Overseas Unions XV
 World XV

References

British & Irish Lions matches
Rugby union and apartheid
1985–86 in British rugby union
1985–86 in French rugby union
1986 in Australian rugby union
1986 in New Zealand rugby union
1986 in South African rugby union